Waders may refer to:

 Wader, a name for various birds in the order Charadriiformes
 Waders (footwear) a type of waterproof boot